Zhuchanghe River Bridge is a  concrete beam bridge in Pan County, Liupanshui, Guizhou, China. , it is among the sixty highest bridges in the world. The bridge is located on G60 Shanghai–Kunming Expressway and crosses the valley of the Zhuchanghe River a small tributary of the Beipan River.

See also
List of highest bridges in the world

References

External links
http://highestbridges.com/wiki/index.php?title=Zhuchanghe_Bridge

Bridges in Guizhou
Bridges completed in 2008